University of Gour Banga is a public state university located in Malda, West Bengal, India. It is one of the newest state universities established in 2008 by the Government of West Bengal on Act XXVI 2007.

History 
The university completed its establishment in 2008 by the Government of West Bengal. At present there are 23 PG departments running with near about 2500 enrollment. 25 General degree colleges with enrollment of 1.50 Lakhs in Malda, Uttar Dinajpur and Dakshin Dinajpur districts, with the exception of Raiganj University College, are affiliated with this university. The Central Bus Terminus is adjacent to the University campus. The University of Gour Banga (UGB) is established by West Bengal Act XXVI of 2007 and located at English Bazar area of Malda district in West Bengal. It is one of the newest state universities established by the Government of West Bengal to address the concerns of ‘equity and access’ and to increase the access to quality higher education for people in less educationally developed districts of Malda, Uttar Dinajpur and Dakshin Dinajpur which have a Graduate Enrolment Ratio of less than the state average and National average as well. The UGB, with its territorial jurisdiction of all over Malda, Uttar Dinajpur and Dakshin Dinajpur districts initiated its academic activities from the academic year 2008 in keeping with the philosophy of achieving and maintaining the highest levels of academic excellence and meeting the aspiration of the socio-economically backward segments of Muslims, SC and ST which constitute more than 75 percent of the population in its catchment area.

Prof. Surabhi Bandyopadhyay, the former vice-chancellor of Netaji Subhas Open University, became the first vice chancellor of the university, while the former registrar of University of North Bengal, Dr. Tapash Kumar Chattopadhyay, became the first acting registrar, all in 2008. Prof. Gopa Dutta was the second vice chancellor.

The logo of the University of Gour Banga was prepared in the second week of June 2008 by Sameer Rakshit, the head of the Department of Architecture, Jadavpur University.
Rakshit is also in charge of designing the main building of the University of Gour Banga, which started functioning from the ground-floor of the Post-Graduate Section of Malda College in 2008. From 2011 this university is functioning in its own place which is near Rabindra Bhaban, Malda 732103, West Bengal, India.

Organisation and Administration

Governance

The Vice-chancellor of the University of Gour Banga is the chief executive officer of the university. In 2021 Shanti Chhetri was appointed as Vice-chancellor of the university.

Faculties and Departments

University of Gour Banga has 23 departments organized into three faculties.

 Faculty of Science

This faculty consists of the departments of Mathematics, Physics, Chemistry, Computer Science, Food & Nutrition, Botany, Zoology, and Physiology.

 Faculty of Humanities, Social Science & Commerce

This faculty consists of the departments of Bengali, English, Arabic, Sanskrit, History, Geography, Political Science, Philosophy, Economics, Sociology, and Commerce.

 Faculty of Law, Education, Journalism, Library Science, and Physical Education

This faculty consists of the departments of Education, Library and Information Science, Law, and Mass Communication.

Affiliations

The university is an affiliating institution and has its jurisdiction over the colleges of Malda, Uttar Dinajpur and Dakshin Dinajpur districts.

Academics

Admission
One has to pass the secondary (10+2) examination for admission in the undergraduate courses. While one have to take an entrance examination after the undergraduate degree for the admission in postgraduate courses.

Accreditation
In 2016 the university has been awarded 'B' grade with CGPA value 2.30 by the National Assessment and Accreditation Council

See also

References

External links

University Grants Commission
National Assessment and Accreditation Council

 
Educational institutions established in 2008
2008 establishments in West Bengal